John Brignon, S.J. (1629 – 12 June 1712) was a translator of religious works into French. Born in St. Malo, France, he was a member of the Society of Jesus and spent the sixty-five years of his religious life chiefly in the translation of works of piety into French. Among these are the works of De Ponte and Juan Eusebio Nieremberg, the Spiritual Combat, the Imitation of Christ and the short treatises of Robert Bellarmine. All these translations have passed through a number of editions. He edited and revised The Devout Life of St. Francis de Sales and the Fondements of Jean-Joseph Surin, S.J. The only works by English authors he translated into French were the Decem Rationes of Blessed Edmund Campion and the Tractatus de Misericordia fidelibus defunctis exhibendâ by Father James Mumford, S.J. He died in Paris.

This article incorporates text from the 1913 Catholic Encyclopedia article "John Brignon" by S.H. Frisbee, a publication now in the public domain.

Latin–French translators
17th-century French Jesuits
1629 births
1712 deaths
French translators
French male non-fiction writers
17th-century French translators